The Fly Air Trike Moster is a Bulgarian ultralight trike that was designed and produced by Fly Air Limited of Trudovec. The design is supplied complete and ready-to-fly.

Design and development
The Trike Moster was designed to comply with the Fédération Aéronautique Internationale microlight category, the German 120 kg class and the US FAR 103 Ultralight Vehicles rules.

The aircraft design features a cable-braced hang glider-style high-wing, weight-shift controls, a single-seat open cockpit without a cockpit fairing, tricycle landing gear and a single engine in pusher configuration.

The aircraft is made from square steel tubing, with its single or double surface wing covered in Dacron sailcloth. The wing is supported by a single tube-type kingpost and uses an "A" frame weight-shift control bar. The powerplant is a single-cylinder, air-cooled, two-stroke, single-ignition  Vittorazi Moster 185 engine, although other engines can also be fitted.

The airframe was designed to be folded up and ground transported in the trunk of an automobile, with the wing carried on the roof.

A number of different wings can be fitted to the basic carriage as it was designed to accept most standard hang gliding wings.

Specifications (Trike Moster)

See also
Fly Air Swallow

References

External links

Trike Moster
2010s Bulgarian sport aircraft
2010s Bulgarian ultralight aircraft
Single-engined pusher aircraft
Ultralight trikes